The A-Team began airing on NBC on January 23, 1983, with the pilot episode, and ended on March 8, 1987, with "Without Reservations". The show comprises 98 episodes over five seasons.

Overview

Episodes

Season 1 (1983)

Season 2 (1983–84)

Season 3 (1984–85)

Season 4 (1985–86)

Season 5 (1986–87)

External links

Episode guide @ TV.com

 
Lists of American action television series episodes